Kim Moon-soo may refer to:

 Kim Moon-soo (politician) (born 1951), Korean politician and the 32nd Governor of Gyeonggi Province, Korea
 Kim Moon-soo (badminton) (born 1963), former badminton player from South Korea
 Kim Moon-soo (novelist) (1939-2012) Korean novelist